Aliquippa is the largest city in Beaver County, Pennsylvania, United States, located on the Ohio River about  northwest of Pittsburgh. The population was 9,238 at the 2020 census. It is part of the Pittsburgh metropolitan area.

Formerly the location of a large Native American trading center, Aliquippa grew to become a center for steel manufacturing by the early 20th century, similar to other towns in the area. With the closure of most large employers by the 1980s, Aliquippa has since become an economically distressed community.

History
 

Aliquippa was founded by the merger of three towns: Aliquippa, Woodlawn, and New Sheffield. There is no known direct connection between Seneca Queen Aliquippa and the city; rather, "Aliquippa" was one of several Indian names selected arbitrarily by the Pittsburgh and Lake Erie Railroad in 1878 for stations along its route. The oldest church within the current boundaries of Aliquippa is Mt. Carmel Presbyterian Church (formerly White Oak Flats Presbyterian Church), established about 1793 in the New Sheffield region on Brodhead Road. 

Aliquippa is best known as the location of a productive steel mill that the Jones and Laughlin Steel Company constructed there along the Ohio River beginning in 1905. Employment at the facility sustained a population of 27,023 in 1940. The mill closed in 1984 during the collapse of the steel industry during the 1980s, and was demolished in 1988. This major economic loss alongside suburbanization caused a major population loss through the end of the 20th century. Many of the city's businesses have left since the closing of the mill. This has left the city economically depressed, with the crime rate dramatically rising over time.

Aliquippa was formally chartered as a city in 1987 by the Aliquippa Borough Council. The B.F. Jones Memorial Library is a historical landmark of the community.

Geography
 
Aliquippa is located at  (40.615, -80.263056).

Surrounding and adjacent neighborhoods
Aliquippa is entirely landlocked by Hopewell Township.  Across the Ohio River, the city runs adjacent with, from north to south, the borough of Baden, Harmony Township and the borough of Ambridge which connects to Aliquippa via the Ambridge–Aliquippa Bridge.

Demographics

The city's population peaked in the 1930s. Since then, it has declined by two-thirds to just over 9,000 people, from a high on 27,116 in the 1930 census.

As of the 2010 census, the city had 9,438 people. The city was 57.6% White, 38.6% Black or African American, 0.1% Native American, 0.4% Asian, and 2.8% were two or more races. 1.3% of the population was of Hispanic or Latino ancestry.

As of the census of 2000, there were 11,734 people, 5,124 households, and 3,176 families residing in the city. The population density was 2,867.7 people per square mile (1,107.7/km). There were 5,843 housing units at an average density of 1,428.0 per square mile (551.6/km). The racial makeup of the city was 62.59% White, 35.52% African American, 0.07% Native American, 0.18% Asian, 0.03% Pacific Islander, 0.18% from other races, and 1.43% from two or more races. Hispanic or Latino of any race were 1.00% of the population.

There were 5,124 households, out of which 24.4% had children under the age of 18 living with them, 35.7% were married couples living together, 21.6% had a female householder with no husband present, and 38.0% were non-families. Of all households 35.0% were made up of individuals, and 17.1% had someone living alone who was 65 years of age or older. The average household size was 2.27 and the average family size was 2.92.

In the city, the population was spread out, with 23.5% under the age of 18, 7.6% from 18 to 24, 25.5% from 25 to 44, 20.9% from 45 to 64, and 22.5% who were 65 years of age or older. The median age was 40 years. For every 100 females, there were 82.7 males. For every 100 females age 18 and over, there were 77.2 males.

The median income for a household in the city was $25,113, and the median income for a family was $34,003. Males had a median income of $27,954 versus $21,358 for females. The per capita income for the city was $13,718. About 17.7% of families and 21.7% of the population were below the poverty line, including 36.3% of those under age 18 and 10.9% of those age 65 or over.

Education
The city's residents are served by the public Aliquippa School District, which includes Aliquippa Junior/Senior High School and Aliquippa Elementary School. Children may also choose to attend an area public charter school, including Beaver Area Academic Charter School or Lincoln Park Performing Arts Charter School. Private schools include Bethel Christian School, Hope Christian Academy, and Sylvania Hills Christian Academy.

Notable people

 Gust Avrakotos, Central Intelligence Agency operative 
 Jon Baldwin, National Football League player
 Tommie Campbell, NFL player
 Daniel Chamovitz, biologist, 7th president of Ben-Gurion University of the Negev
 Francis J. D'Eramo, Judge at the United States Virgin Islands Superior Court on St. Croix.  
 Mike Ditka, NFL Pro Football Hall of Fame player and coach
 Tony Dorsett, NFL Pro Football Hall of Fame player
Kenny Easterday, star of the Canadian movie Kenny (1988)
 Ivor Parry Evans, base commander, Walker AFB
 Tito Francona, Major League Baseball player
 James Frank, the first African-American president of the NCAA 
 Sean Gilbert, NFL player
 Frank Gnup, Canadian football player and coach
 Nate Guenin, National Hockey League player
 Frank Hribar, NFL player
 Ty Law, NFL Pro Football Hall of Fame player
 Joe Letteri, five-time Academy Award winning visual imaging artist 
 Henry Mancini, Grammy and Oscar-winning music composer ("Moon River" and "The Pink Panther Theme"), born in Cleveland, raised in Aliquippa
 Pete Maravich, Basketball Hall of Fame player
 Press Maravich, basketball coach
 Demetria Martinez, poet and author
 Felicia Mason, author
 Doc Medich, MLB pitcher
 Paul Posluszny, NFL player
 Darrelle Revis, Pro Football Hall of Fame player
 Aaron Shust, contemporary Christian music artist
 Curt Singer, NFL player 
 Jesse Steinfeld, Surgeon General of the United States
 Pete Suder, MLB player
 Edward Surratt, Confessed serial killer and rapist from the 1970s. 
 Tim Shaffer, Hall Of Fame sprint car driver
 Robert Wykes, classical flautist

See also
 List of cities and towns along the Ohio River

References

 Feature in Sports Illustrated in January 2011, http://sportsillustrated.cnn.com/vault/article/magazine/MAG1181210/index.htm

External links
 City of Aliquippa website

 
Cities in Pennsylvania
Pennsylvania populated places on the Ohio River
Populated places established in 1793
Pittsburgh metropolitan area
Cities in Beaver County, Pennsylvania
Company towns in Pennsylvania
1793 establishments in Pennsylvania